Beauty for the Asking is a 1939 film drama produced by RKO Pictures, and starring Lucille Ball and Patric Knowles.

It tells the story of Jean Russell (Ball), a beautician who is jilted by her boyfriend (Knowles) so he can marry an older but wealthy woman. Russell invents a new facial cream, and with the financial backing of her former boyfriend's wife (Frieda Inescort), starts a business that makes her a millionaire.

Reception
RKO's pre-release publicity claimed that the film was to be an "exposé of the beauty racket" but reviewers of the day concluded that it was a standard "romantic love triangle".

Recently Leonard Maltin has written favorably of the film, suggesting that the film offered an unusual feminist viewpoint for its time, and acknowledging that Ball delivered a strong performance.

Cast
 Lucille Ball as Jean Russell
 Patric Knowles as Denny Williams
 Donald Woods as Jeffrey Martin
 Frieda Inescort as Flora Barton-Williams
 Inez Courtney as Gwen Morrison
 Leona Maricle as Eve Harrington
 Frances Mercer as Patricia Wharton
 Whitney Bourne as Peggy Ponsby
 George Beranger as Cyril (as George Andre Beranger)
 Kay Sutton as Miss Whitman, Jean's Secretary
 Ann Evers as Lois Peabody

Notes

References
 Jewell, Richard B. and Harbin, Vernon, The RKO Story, Octopus Books, London, 1982. 
 Maltin, Leonard, Leonard Maltin's 1998 Movie & Video Guide, Signet Books, 1997.

External links 
 
 
 
 

1939 films
1939 romantic drama films
American black-and-white films
American romantic drama films
Films about businesspeople
Films directed by Glenn Tryon
Films scored by Roy Webb
RKO Pictures films
1930s English-language films
1930s American films